Brokers Point or Brokers Nose or Corrimal Peak or Brokers Peak, is a point on the Illawarra Range, in the state of New South Wales, Australia.

Location and features
At its summit there is a television transmission tower. There is a track leading to the top and both track and summit are open to the public; the summit is protected as part of the Illawarra Escarpment State Recreation Area.

Etymology
The name is vague in its origins and there are two possible explanations for it. One tells that an early settler named Brooker was the origin, the second that poor miners would take their families up to the summit for picnics, and they were brokers (poor people).

See also

 List of mountains in New South Wales
 List of geographical noses

References

Illawarra escarpment
Wollongong
Mountains of New South Wales